FC Dinamo Zugdidi is a Georgian football club based in Zugdidi. Their club competeted in Liga 3 from 2023 after didn't play all matches in Erovnuli Liga 2 later automatically relegation.

History
 1918–??: Odishi Zugdidi
 1964–65: Engurhesi Zugdidi
 1965–73: Inguri Zugdidi
 1974–90: Dinamo Zugdidi
 1990–94: Odishi Zugdidi
 1994–95: Dinamo Zugdidi
 1995–96: Dinamo-Odishi Zugdidi
 1996–99: Odishi Zugdidi
 2000–01: Dinamo Zugdidi
 2001–03: Lazika Zugdidi
 2003: Spartak-Lazika Zugdidi
 2004: Dinamo Zugdidi
 2004–06: FC Zugdidi
 2006–09: Mglebi Zugdidi
 2009–12: Baia Zugdidi
 2012–20: FC Zugdidi
 2020–: Dinamo Zugdidi

The club was founded in 1918 as Odishi Zugdidi. In 1990, FC Odishi Zugdidi made his debut in the Umaglesi Liga. In the season 1998–99 finished 15th and was relegated to Pirveli Liga. Before the 2001–02 season the club changed its name to FC Lazika Zugdidi and in 2002–03 the club won promotion to Umaglesi Liga. Before the 2003–04 season FC Lazika Zugdidi merged with the club FC Spartaki Tbilisi played in Pirveli Liga. During the winter break, FC Spartak-Lazika Zugdidi apparently relocated to Tbilisi and renamed FC Spartaki Tbilisi. The fusion was disbanded and the club changed its name from FC Dinamo Zugdidi to FC Zugdidi.

In July 2006, FC Zugdidi and FC Mglebi Zugdidi merged. FC Mglebi Zugdidi played in Regionuli Liga. The club continued to perform in Pirveli League, but was called FC Mglebi Zugdidi. In the season 2006–07, won first place and returned to Umaglesi Liga. After the completion of the 2008–09 season came in seventh place, but for financial reasons has been resolved.

The FC Baia Zugdidi was founded in 2006. In 2009, FC Baia Zugdidi won promotion to the Umaglesi Liga.

FC Baia Zugdidi took the place of the predecessor. Before the 2012–13 season the club changed its name from FC Baia Zugdidi to FC Zugdidi.

Seasons

As Odishi / Dinamo 
{|class="wikitable"
|-bgcolor="#efefef"
! Season
! League
! Pos.
! Pl.
! W
! D
! L
! GF
! GA
! P
! Cup
! Notes
! Manager
|-
|1998–99
|Umaglesi Liga
|align=right|15
|align=right|30||align=right|6||align=right|2||align=right|22
|align=right|21||align=right|70||align=right|20
|
|Relegated
|
|-
|1999-00
|bgcolor=#ffa07a|Pirveli Liga
|align=right|
|align=right| ||align=right| ||align=right| ||align=right| 
|align=right| ||align=right| ||align=right| 
|
|
|
|-
|2000–01
|bgcolor=#ffa07a|Pirveli Liga
|align=right|
|align=right| ||align=right| ||align=right| ||align=right| 
|align=right| ||align=right| ||align=right| 
|
|Relegated
|
|-
|2001–02
|bgcolor=#98bb98|Regionuli Liga West
|align=right|
|align=right| ||align=right| ||align=right| ||align=right| 
|align=right| ||align=right| ||align=right| 
|
|
|
|-
|2002–03
|bgcolor=#98bb98|Regionuli Liga West
|align=right|
|align=right| ||align=right| ||align=right| ||align=right| 
|align=right| ||align=right| ||align=right| 
|
|
|
|-
|2003–04
|bgcolor=#98bb98|Regionuli Liga West
|align=right|
|align=right| ||align=right| ||align=right| ||align=right| 
|align=right| ||align=right| ||align=right| 
|
|
|
|-
|2004–05
|bgcolor=#98bb98|Regionuli Liga West
|align=right|
|align=right| ||align=right| ||align=right| ||align=right| 
|align=right| ||align=right| ||align=right| 
|
|
|
|-
|2005–06
|bgcolor=#98bb98|Regionuli Liga West
|align=right|
|align=right| ||align=right| ||align=right| ||align=right| 
|align=right| ||align=right| ||align=right| 
|
|
|
|-
|2006–07
|bgcolor=#98bb98|Regionuli Liga West
|align=right|
|align=right| ||align=right| ||align=right| ||align=right| 
|align=right| ||align=right| ||align=right| 
|
|
|
|-
|}

As Baia / Mglebi / FC Zugdidi 

{|class="wikitable"
|-bgcolor="#efefef"
! Season !! League !!Pos. !! Pl. !! W !! D !!L !! GF !!GA !! Pts !!Cup !! Europe !!Notes !!Manager
|-
|2005–06
|rowspan=2 bgcolor=#ffa07a|Pirveli Liga
|align=right|12
|align=right|34||align=right|12||align=right|7||align=right|15
|align=right|24||align=right|33||align=right|43
|Round of 32
|
|FC Zugdidi
|
|-
|2006–07
|align=right|1
|align=right|34||align=right|24||align=right|4||align=right|6
|align=right|58||align=right|24||align=right|76
|1st Round
|
|Mglebi Zugdidi
|
|-
|2007–08
|rowspan=6|Umaglesi Liga
|align=right|7
|align=right|26||align=right|10||align=right|3||align=right|13
|align=right|27||align=right|33||align=right|33
|Round of 16
|
|Mglebi Zugdidi
|
|-
|2008–09
|align=right|7
|align=right|30||align=right|10||align=right|6||align=right|14
|align=right|36||align=right|41||align=right|36
|Round of 32
|
|Mglebi Zugdidi
|
|-
|2009–10
|align=right|8
|align=right|36||align=right|7||align=right|11||align=right|18
|align=right|29||align=right|48||align=right|32
|Quarter-finals
|
|Baia Zugdidi
|
|-
|2010–11
|align=right|6
|align=right|36||align=right|13||align=right|5||align=right|18
|align=right|36||align=right|51||align=right|44
|Round of 16
|
|Baia Zugdidi
|
|-
|2011–12
|align=right| 7
|align=right|28 ||align=right|5 ||align=right|7 ||align=right| 16
|align=right|25 ||align=right|49 ||align=right| 22
|Quarter-finals
|
|Baia Zugdidi
|
|-
|2012–13
|align=right|6
|align=right|32 ||align=right|10 ||align=right|6 ||align=right|16
|align=right|31 ||align=right|52 ||align=right|36
|Round of 16
|
|FC Zugdidi
|
|}

As Baia Zugdidi (reserves) 
{|class="wikitable"
|-bgcolor="#efefef"
! Season
! League
! Pos.
! Pl.
! W
! D
! L
! GF
! GA
! P
!Cup
! Europe
!Notes
!Manager
|-
|2008–09
|bgcolor=#ffa07a|Pirveli Liga
|align=right bgcolor=silver|2
|align=right|30||align=right|19||align=right|6||align=right|5
|align=right|58||align=right|20||align=right|63
|Round of 16
|
|Promoted
|
|-
|}

Honours
Georgian Soviet Championship
Champion: 1964, 1973 
Georgian Soviet Cup
Champion: 1973, 1984
Pirveli Liga
Champion: 2003, 2007
Silver Medal winner: 2009

Current squad 
As of August 2019

Managers

 Herbert Zanker  (Jul 1, 2008 – June 30, 2009)
 Elguja Kometiani (Dec 17, 2009 – Dec 27, 2011)
 Gocha Tkebuchava (Jan 6, 2012 – May 15, 2012)
 Elguja Kometiani (May 15, 2012 – June 30, 2013)
 Klimenti Tsitaishvili (Aug 1, 2013 – Nov 10, 2013)
 Sergo Gabelaia (Nov 14–19, 2013)
 Giorgi Daraselia (Nov 19, 2014 – June 1, 2014)
 Nestor Mumladze (Aug 1, 2014 – Oct 20, 2014)
 Besik Sherozia (Oct 21, 2014 – Nov 14, 2015)
 Yuriy Bakalov (Jan 11, 2016 – Aug 2016)
 Otar Gabelia (Aug 2016 – Aug 2016)
 Volodymyr Lyutyi (since Aug 2016)

Women's team
The women's team participated in the 2010–11 UEFA Women's Champions League qualifying round, where it lost all three matches.

References

External links
 Official website 
 Soccerway profile

 
Football clubs in Georgia (country)
Association football clubs established in 1919
FC Zugdidi